Ekaterina Enina (born 10 May 1993 in Chelyabinsk) is a Russian volleyball player. She is part of the Russia women's national volleyball team. She competed at the 2020 Summer Olympics.

Career 
She participated in the 2017 European championship, and 2016/17 Superliga.

On club level she has played for VC Uralochka-NTMK, and VC Dynamo Moscow.

References

External links 
 Ekaterina Enina – Volleyball player profile & career statistics – Global Sports Archive
 RUS W: Enina marks women’s Russian Super League round 8!

Living people
Russian women's volleyball players
Volleyball players at the 2020 Summer Olympics
Olympic volleyball players of Russia
Sportspeople from Chelyabinsk
1993 births
20th-century Russian women
21st-century Russian women